Goki Dam, is an earthfill and gravity dam on Goki river near Darwha, Yavatmal district in state of Maharashtra in India.

Specifications

Purpose
 Irrigation
 Water supply

See also
 Dams in Maharashtra
 List of reservoirs and dams in India

References

Dams in Yavatmal district
Dams completed in 1981
1981 establishments in Maharashtra